Alexander Gillon (August 13, 1741October 6, 1794) was an American merchant and seaman from Charleston, South Carolina. He represented South Carolina in the U.S. House in 1793 and 1794.

Early life and family
Gillon was born in 1741 in Rotterdam in the Dutch Republic of Scottish parents. He pursued an education in London and stayed there for some time. He became a sea captain and in 1765 sailed to Charleston, South Carolina in the brigantine Surprize. He returned in 1766 in the brigantine Free-Mason . While in Charleston Gillon married Mrs. Mary Cripps, a widow from Kent residing in the city. He sailed back to Britain shortly after his marriage but then returned to Charleston that same year.  On February 10, 1789 he married Ann Purcell, the daughter of Reverend Henry Purcell, rector of St Michael's Church in Charleston. He was also an owner of 106 slaves.

Charleston merchant
In 1766 he settled in Charleston and established a large business. Some ten years later he became involved in politics. He was a delegate to the Second Provincial Congress of South Carolina in 1775 and 1776 and was a member of the first general assembly in 1776.

His men elected him captain of the German Fusiliers of Charleston in May 1775. Three years later South Carolina appointed him Commodore of the South Carolina Navy and sent him to France to procure vessels for the Navy.

South Carolina
In 1780 he chartered Indien from the Duke of Luxembourg on behalf of South Carolina and the South Carolina Navy, for a quarter-share of her prizes. Gillon renamed the frigate South Carolina.

In 1781 the South Carolina, manned by American officers and a group of European seamen and marines, sailed across the Atlantic toward Charleston. When she found that the British had already occupied that city she sailed to Cuba.

Between August and October 1781 she captured a cutter, a privateer, the brig Venus and seven other vessels.

South Carolina arrived at Havana on January 12, 1782. At Havana, after negotiations between Gillon and the Spanish, the South Carolina joined a force of 59 vessels sent to capture the British colony of New Providence in the Bahamas. On April 22 the expedition sailed and by May 5 the whole fleet had reached New Providence. On May 8 the colony surrendered. This was the third capture of New Providence during the American Revolutionary War.

South Carolina then sailed north, arriving at Philadelphia on May 28 . Here she remained nearly six months. While she was there the Duke of Luxembourg dismissed Gillon and replaced him as captain with Captain John Joyner.

Political career
He was the founder and first president of the Charleston Chamber of Commerce.

In 1784 he was elected to the Continental Congress but did not attend. Four years later he was a delegate to the State convention that ratified the Federal Constitution in 1788. Next, he was elected as an Anti-Administration candidate to the Third Congress. He served from March 4, 1793 until his death on October 6, 1794 at his plantation. He was buried in the family burial ground at the plantation “Gillon’s Retreat,” Orangeburg District, Calhoun County, South Carolina.

See also
 List of United States Congress members who died in office (1790–1899)

References
 Coker, P. C., III. (1987) Charleston's Maritime Heritage, 1670-1865: An Illustrated History. (Charleston, S.C.: Coker-Craft).

External links
Biographic sketch at U.S. Congress website

1741 births
1794 deaths
Members of the South Carolina House of Representatives
Members of the United States House of Representatives from South Carolina
British emigrants to the United States
18th-century American politicians